Ernest Martin Skinner (January 15, 1866 – November 26/27, 1960) was an American pipe organ builder. His electro-pneumatic switching systems advanced the technology of organ building in the first part of the 20th century.

Biography
Skinner was born in Clarion, Pennsylvania, to touring concert singers Washington and Alice Skinner. His father organized a music company in Taunton, Massachusetts and sang in a quartet in Taunton's Unitarian Church. It was at this church that Skinner encountered his first organ. Skinner attended rehearsals, the performances of Gilbert and Sullivan, and operettas which stimulated his interest in music. He got a job as a bellows pumper at fifteen cents per hour in Taunton's Baptist church where he had his first experiences repairing and constructing organs.

When he was a teenager, the family moved to West Somerville, Massachusetts, where he attended high school for six months. In his autobiography, he stated that the reason for leaving his schooling was his inability to understand Latin, but Dorothy Holden in her biography: "The Life and Work of Ernest M. Skinner" attributes it to the fact that the family fortune had declined and Skinner had to help support them. 

He became a "shop boy" for George H. Ryder, a small organ builder located in Reading, Massachusetts. After four years he was fired, which led to his employment at the shop of preeminent Boston organ builder George Hutchings, following Ryder's foreman, Horace Marden, and voicer, William H. Dolbeer. At Hutchings he worked first as a tuner, rising to the post of factory superintendent during his twelve years with the firm.

In 1893 in Bethel, Maine, he married Bethel native Mabel Hastings.

The 1897 Hutchings organ at the Basilica and Shrine of Our Lady of Perpetual Help in Boston drew national attention and acclaim for Hutchings, though he did not mention his young factory superintendent, Ernest Skinner, by name.

Skinner made the first of two public trips to England, crossing the Atlantic on a cattle steamer in 1898. Skinner was introduced to the work of Henry Willis, the London builder whose high-pressure chorus reeds and tuba 'organ stop' set the benchmark for much of the 20th century. Skinner was given access to the large Willis organ at St George's Hall, Liverpool, and met privately with Willis, who tutored him in voicing practices and techniques not yet known in the United States. Skinner then visited France where he met Louis Vierne, the blind organist at Notre-Dame in Paris. Upon his return to Boston, Skinner made his first pedal trombone modeled after the work of Willis for the 1900 Hutchings organ installed at Boston Music Hall. The first documented instance of the Pitman windchest, as developed by Skinner, appeared in the 1899 Hutchings-Votey organ installed at the Flatbush Reformed Dutch Church in Brooklyn, New York, although some sources mention origins in Hutchings organs as early as 1893.

In 1901, Skinner decided to strike out on his own. In 1902, he entered into a partnership to form the Skinner & Cole Company with another former Hutchings-Votey employee. By 1904 the partnership had dissolved, and the Ernest M. Skinner & Company purchased the Skinner and Cole assets.

Organ development and design
Skinner was one of the first organ builders to try to establish a systematic method for providing fixed dimensions in his organ consoles. Prior to this, each organ builder might use different dimensions on their consoles, causing problems with adapting to different layouts and positions of keyboards and pedalboards of different instruments, even by the same builder. Skinner worked to develop a set of universal distances between the various keyboards, determining the ideal placement of the pedal board, at a specific distance from the Great manual, as well as the placement of the various expression shoes and other mechanical devices, that have significantly contributed to the standard American Guild of Organists (AGO) Console Measurements, in use in the United States since 1930.

Skinner consoles had fully adjustable combination pistons and combination actions, decades before other American firms adopted similar devices. Access to pre-sets, to store and recall combination controls, on Skinner instruments, was located on numbered rows of buttons located between the keyboards.

Skinner is credited with the advancement of electro-pneumatic action, which controls the mechanical operation of the instruments. These huge (frequently several tons) and highly sophisticated devices were built of wood, leather, and metal organ parts, and used low-voltage DC current and low-pressure pressurized air to control and direct the switching and control commands. These actions allowed the pipework of the instrument to be located in any part of a building, while the console could be located hundreds of feet away, and allowing a single organist to have control over every aspect of the instrument.

Skinner developed numerous automatic playing mechanisms, which allowed an unskilled individual to operate a large pipe organ in a manner similar to a player piano. This was a lifelong interest of Skinner, and he frequently worked in secret. The Toledo Museum of Art contains a fully restored Skinner instrument that uses a Skinner player action. In 1916, Skinner created and patented the Orchestrator player-relay mechanism.

The first of Skinner's new stops, the Erzähler, appeared in 1904, and was soon joined by other tonal colors which Skinner worked on between 1908 and 1924, including flügel horn, and heckelphone. In addition to his orchestral color reeds, Skinner developed numerous string and hybrid flue stops, many with matching celestes. Among these were the Salicional/Voix Celeste and Dulciana/Unda Maris present in the Swell and Choir divisions of many American organs of the era, as well as his Flauto Dolce/Flute Celeste, his Dulcet (a pair of very narrow scaled string ranks tuned with a fast beat to heighten the intensity), a pair of inverted-flare gambas found in the solo divisions of many of his larger organs that allowed a rich, 'cello-like timbre for solo lines in the tenor range, the Kleine Erzähler, a softer, brighter version of his earlier Erzähler (which mimics the effect of string players playing very softly), as well as his Pedal Violones at 32' and 16' pitches which he defined as "subtle, soft string stops". Skinner is known for his imitative french horn stop, which is the only sonic creation that he patented.

His earliest designs, built out of his workshop in South Boston, were for George Foster Peabody and for the Great Hall of City College in New York.

Ernest M. Skinner & Company built large organs for Old South Church in Boston, Cathedral of St. John the Divine (op. 150, 1906); Saint Luke's Episcopal Church, Evanston, Illinois (op. 327, 1922); Sage Chapel at Cornell University (op. 175, 1909); Carnegie Music Hall, Pittsburgh (op. 180, 1910); Appleton Chapel, Harvard (op. 197, 1912); Saint Thomas Episcopal Church, New York (op. 205, 1913); Finney Chapel, Oberlin College (op. 230, 1914), Kirkpatrick Chapel at Rutgers College (Op. 255, 1916), and the Brick Presbyterian Church, New York (op. 280, 1917).

In 1919, the Ernest M. Skinner & Company was reorganized with Arthur H. Marks (the former general manager and vice-president of the Goodrich Rubber Company) as the president and Skinner as vice-president of the newly organized Skinner Organ Company. This allowed Skinner to focus on technical and artistic aspects, while others would manage the commercial aspects of the company. In 1924, at the behest of Marks and William Zeuch, another principal at the factory, Skinner made his second trip to England, this time meeting with Henry Willis III, the grandson of Henry Willis (Sr.), and spending time in France with Marcel Dupré learning about mutation stops and chorus work of the French Romantic organ.

Declining success and sale of the Skinner Organ Company
The Skinner Organ Company built hundreds of pipe organs for customers all across the United States. The relationship between Skinner and the business managers of his company was rarely good, but by 1927 friction had built between Marks and Skinner. At the suggestion of English organ builder Henry Willis III, George Donald Harrison joined the Skinner staff as assistant general manager in 1927. Initially, this was accepted positively by Skinner, and collaborations between Skinner and Harrison resulted in four Landmark Organs in the late 1920s. The first was built in 1928 for the University of Michigan at Ann Arbor, then two additional large organs, one for the Chapel at Princeton University, then another for Rockefeller Memorial Chapel at the University of Chicago. The final instrument was the rebuilding and expansion of the Newberry Memorial Organ, which is located in Woolsey Hall at Yale University. The Woolsey Hall organ is the largest instrument to bear the Skinner nameplate, and remains virtually unaltered. It is widely considered to be one of the finest "symphonic organs" in the world.

With the onset of the Great Depression and coincident improvements in the recording and playback of electronically amplified music in larger public spaces, orders for pipe organs fell. The Skinner Company was forced to lay off workers and scale back production. The world of organ music and performance in the early 1930s had also begun to change. The orchestral style of instrument, which was the Skinner Company's specialty, had been falling from favor among many younger organists, who were looking for a more classical organ sound. Harrison, who had been working on the development of this new tonal direction for the company, was becoming more frequently requested as the designer and finisher of the limited number of available projects, while Skinner found himself being requested less. Many organists did maintain their loyalty to Skinner and insisted on his involvement.

The 1932 merger of the Aeolian Organ Company with the Skinner Company and the resulting change of the company name to Aeolian-Skinner, resulted in increasing tension between Skinner, Harrison, and Marks, as Skinner saw his technical and artistic influence at the company beginning to be diminished by the ascension of Harrison.

On July 14, 1933, Skinner was formally stripped of his titles and authority within the company by the Board of Directors of the Aeolian-Skinner Company, following his attempts to circumvent Harrison and influence the terms of the contract for the organ at Grace Cathedral in San Francisco.

The final instrument which was personally designed and finished by Skinner, though built by the Aeolian-Skinner factory, is the large organ at the Chapel of Girard College in Philadelphia (Opus 872 - 1933). Speaking down through a large ceiling grill and into the resonant acoustics of the chapel, even the softest voices of the instrument are clearly heard throughout the room.

As pressure increased within the Aeolian-Skinner Company, Skinner began to plan the formation of a new organ company with his son, Richmond Hastings Skinner, which he planned to call the Ernest M. Skinner and Son Organ Company, with intention to compete with the Aeolian-Skinner Company. Marks was able to persuade Skinner (with the help of Skinner's wife Mabel and his son Richmond) to instead enter into a five-year contract with the Skinner Organ Company that provided Skinner with an annual salary of $5,000 in exchange for the continued use of his name, but required that Mr. Skinner and his newly purchased interest in the Methuen Organ Company would not compete with Aeolian-Skinner in the construction of new organs, but rather "confine his work..." in the Methuen shop "...to the rebuilding of older pipe organs."

In January 1936, Skinner sold his interest in the Skinner Organ Company to purchase the property now known as Methuen Memorial Music Hall in Methuen, Massachusetts, including the adjacent organ factory. Both had been built by Edward Francis Searles to house and maintain the very large organ which was originally built for the Boston Music Hall in 1863. In the following years Skinner presented public performances of both choral and organ works with featured performers including Marcel Dupré and E. Power Biggs.

Later years 
In 1936, Skinner, and his son Richmond Hastings Skinner, were  awarded the contract for what would be his final instrument, for the Washington National Cathedral. The instrument was dedicated in the fall of 1938, to wide national acclaim.

World War II and the resulting materials shortages and related financial troubles forced the company to file for bankruptcy on October 1, 1941. The Methuen Organ Shop burned to the ground on June 17, 1943; the adjacent Music Hall and its organ were saved.

In January 1947 Skinner joined the Schantz Organ Company in Orrville, Ohio.

In 1949, then in his eighties and almost completely deaf, Skinner retired from organ building completely. He then began writing the book The Composition of the Organ, which remained unpublished in his lifetime, and was completed and published by his son in 1980.

Skinner was always a prolific writer, with his letters penned to the editors of The Diapason and The American Organist appearing in those publications from the 1940s onward, wherein he worked to defend his tonal ideals, and attempted to regain lost territory on the American musical landscape. As early as the mid-1930s, Skinner saw many of his instruments rebuilt or modified beyond recognition, while others were simply removed and thrown out wholesale, in the name of "musical progress." Even three of the "Landmark Organs" mentioned in the previous section were subject to this trend, with modifications to the University of Chicago organ being carried out only a few years after its completion.

Not every organist felt obliged to follow the dictates of the "organ reform movement" and any discussion of Skinner would be incomplete without mentioning his extensive, informative and influential writings on the organ and its music, published in books and national journals over most of his career.

Following the death of his wife Mabel in 1951, Skinner entered a downward spiral from which he never recovered. The tonal revision of his earlier organs at St. John the Divine (op. 150, 1911), St. Thomas (op. 205, 1913) and his final large organ built for the National Cathedral all fell subject to this trend by the mid-1950s, further complicating his emotional state as he saw his life's work  and ideals (and by extension, himself) gradually becoming extinct. Fortunately, in recent decades there has been a large resurgence of interest in restoring E. M. Skinner's instruments to their original condition. In many cases in which Skinner's pipework was replaced with more generic or baroque sounds, the Skinner pipework was put in storage, thus making it easier for the eventual rebuilding of his instruments to be restored back to their original tonal designs and sound. This has preserved E. M. Skinner's instruments for future generations of organists and listeners to experience his glorious instruments.

In 1956 he was living in Dorchester, MA. The final years of Mr. Skinner's life found him living in relative obscurity in California, having far outlived most of his contemporaries.

Skinner died during the night of November 26–27, 1960, at the age of 94, at the family home. He is buried in Bethel, Maine, in his wife's family plot.

Bibliography/suggested reading
 The Life and Work of Ernest M. Skinner — Dorothy Holden published by The Organ Historical Society, 1985
 Stop, Open and Reed published by The Organ Historical Society, 1997
 All the Stops: The Glorious Pipe Organ and Its American Masters — Craig R. Whitney published by PublicAffairs a member of the Perseus Books Group
 The American Classic Organ: A History in Letters — Charles Callahan published by The Organ Historical Society, 1990
 The Modern Organ-- Ernest M. Skinner published by the H.W. Gray Co., 1917
 The Composition of the Organ, an organ building primer written by Skinner, originally planned for release in 1951, but completed by his son Richmond and released in 1981.

List of important E. M. Skinner organs
 Old Cabell Hall, University of Virginia. Charlottesville, VA. 1906, Opus 127. (oldest surviving E.M. Skinner Organ in original condition)
 Trinity Cathedral (Episcopal) Cleveland, OH.  1907, Opus 140. Removed in 1997, pipework dispersed to several builders. New instrument created in 2021 by the Muller Pipe Organ Company, combining Aeolian-Skinner Opus 1188 (originally built for St. Paul’s Episcopal Church, Richmond VA) and Skinner Opus 245 (originally built for Church of the Transfiguration, Cleveland OH)
 Harvard Divinity School, Andover Chapel, Cambridge, MA. 1911, Opus 184
 Williams College, Grace Hall, Williamstown MA. 1911, Opus 195. Remaining pipework moved to Dunwoody United Methodist Church in Dunwoody, GA in 2019 and combined with another instrument
 St. Thomas Episcopal Church, New York City (Manhattan) 1913, Opus 205. Rebuilt by Aeolian-Skinner in 1955, replaced by new instrument (Dobson) in 2018
 Oberlin College, Finney Chapel, Oberlin OH. 1921, Opus 230. Rebuilt by Aeolian-Skinner in 1955, replaced by new instrument (Fisk) in 2001
 Church of our Father, Universalist (today: First Unitarian Universalist Church) Detroit, MI. 1925, Opus 232
 Municipal Auditorium, Portland OR. 1916, Opus 265. Moved to Alpenrose Dairy Opera House, Portland OR in 1971
 Grove Park Inn Hotel, Asheville, NC. 1919, Opus 295. Moved to First Presbyterian Church, Baltimore, MD in 1929, destroyed 1961 
 Civic Auditorium, St. Paul, MN.  1921, Opus 308. Moved to Old South Church, Boston, MA in 1985.
 Second Congregational Church (today: The United Congregational Church), Holyoke, MA. 1920, Opus 322
 St. Luke's Episcopal Church, Evanston, IL. 1922 Opus 327 
 Public Auditorium, Cleveland, OH. 1922 Opus 328
 Cleveland Museum of Art, Garden Court, Cleveland, OH. 1922 Opus 333. Rebuilt by Holtkamp in 1933 and 1946, moved to Museum's new Gartner Auditorium in 1971
 Trinity Church Wall Street, New York City (Manhattan). 1923, Opus 408. Rebuilt by Aeolian-Skinner in 1970, removed in 2003, will be replaced by new instrument (Glatter-Götz/Rosales) in 2023.
 St. John's Episcopal Cathedral Los Angeles, CA. 1924, Opus 446
 California Palace of the Legion of Honor, San Francisco, CA. 1924, Opus 455 
 Jefferson Avenue Presbyterian Church, Detroit MI. 1924, Opus 475.
 Trinity Episcopal Church, San Francisco CA. 1924, Opus 477.
 Hollywood High School, Los Angeles CA. 1924, Opus 481
 Temple Emanu-El, San Francisco CA. 1924, Opus 497
 University Auditorium, University of Florida, Gainesville, FL. 1924, Opus 501. Rebuilt by Aeolian-Skinner in 1965 and by Möller in 1980 and 1992
 St. Ann's and the Holy Trinity Church, New York City (Brooklyn). 1925, Opus 524
 Detroit Masonic Temple, Scottish Rite Cathedral (today: Jack White Theater) Detroit, MI. 1925, Opus 529
 Trinity Episcopal Church, Gallery Organ, Boston, MA 1926, Opus 574
 Stambaugh Auditorium, Youngstown, OH. 1926, Opus 582
 Toledo Museum of Art, Toledo, OH. 1926, Opus 603
 Rockefeller Chapel, University of Chicago, Chicago, IL. 1927, Opus 634
 Masonic Temple, Dayton, OH. 1926, Opus 624
 St. Bartholomew's Episcopal Church, New York City (Manhattan). 1927, Opus 651. Used pipework from previous church building, expanded in 1927 and 1930, rebuilt by Aeolian-Skinner in 1937 (West Gallery) and 1953 (Chancel)
 Immanuel Presbyterian Church, Los Angeles, CA. 1927, Opus 676
 Woolsey Hall, Yale University, New Haven, CT. 1928, Opus 722. Made extensive use of pipework from preceding Hutchings-Votey Organ (1902)
 Our Lady, Queen of the Most Holy Rosary Cathedral, Toledo, OH. 1930, Opus 820
 Church of the Immaculate Conception, Philadelphia, PA. 1927, Opus 660. Removed in 1987 and relocated to Cincinnati Museum Center at Union Terminal
 Dayton Art Institute, Dayton, OH. 1929, Opus 749
 Old First Presbyterian Church, Columbus, OH. 1929, Opus 773 
 Severance Hall, Cleveland, OH. 1929, Opus 816
 Brown Memorial Presbyterian Church, Baltimore, MD. 1930, Opus 839
 First Congregational Church, Los Angeles, CA. 1931, Opus 856.
 Girard College Chapel, Philadelphia, PA. 1931, Opus 872
 Washington National Cathedral, Washington, DC. 1938, Opus 510 (built by the E.M. Skinner&Son firm, this instrument replaced the two-manual Aeolian-Skinner Opus 883 from 1932. Rebuilt by Aeolian-Skinner in 1957, 1962 and 1964, further rebuilding by other firms in 1975 and 1988)

References 

American pipe organ builders
1866 births
1960 deaths
Methuen, Massachusetts
Musical instrument manufacturing companies of the United States